Magda is a feminine given name. It may also refer to:

 Magda (1917 film), an American film by Emile Chautard
 Magda (2004 film), an animated short film by Chel White
 Magda, São Paulo, Brazil, a municipality
 Marinko Magda, Serbian mass murderer